Live at Montreux 2006: They All Came Down to Montreux is the first live release by English hard rock band Deep Purple's mk VIII lineup. This concert was recorded in Montreux, during 2006 Rapture of the Deep tour. Besides a DVD release, the concert film has also been released on HD DVD and Blu-ray. The CD includes four tracks from their most recent album Rapture of the Deep and seven tracks originally from the Mk II line up including six from Machine Head. The twelfth track is a Don Airey keyboard solo.

Track listings
All songs written by Ritchie Blackmore, Ian Gillan, Roger Glover, Jon Lord, and Ian Paice except where noted.

CD track listing
"Pictures of Home" – 3:57
"Things I Never Said" (Gillan, Steve Morse, Glover, Don Airey, Paice) – 5:44
"Strange Kind of Woman" – 5:05
"Rapture of the Deep" (Gillan, Morse, Glover, Airey, Paice) – 5:16
"Wrong Man" (Gillan, Morse, Glover, Airey, Paice) – 4:25
"Kiss Tomorrow Goodbye" (Gillan, Morse, Glover, Airey, Paice) – 4:13
"When a Blind Man Cries" – 3:33
Credited to Gillan, Morse, Glover, Lord and Paice on this release
"Lazy" – 7:34
"Keyboard Solo" (Instrumental) (Airey, Albert Ammons, Wolfgang Amadeus Mozart) – 4:58
"Space Truckin'" – 4:54
"Highway Star" – 8:42
"Smoke on the Water" – 9:12

DVD track listing
DVD one Live at Montreux 2006
 "Pictures of Home"
 "Things I Never Said"
 "Strange Kind of Woman"
 "Rapture of the Deep"
 "Wrong Man"
 "The Well-Dressed Guitar"
 "Kiss Tomorrow Goodbye"
 "When a Blind Man Cries"
 "Lazy"
 "Keyboard Solo" (Instrumental)
 "Space Truckin'"
 "Highway Star"
 "Smoke on the Water"
 "Hush" (with Michael Bradford)
 "Too Much Fun" (jam) (with "Funky" Claude Nobs)
 "Black Night"

DVD twoLondon Hard Rock Cafe 2006
 "Fireball"
 "I Got Your Number"
 "Strange Kind of Woman"
 "Kiss Tomorrow Goodbye"
 "Rapture of the Deep"
 "Wrong Man"
 "Lazy"
 "Perfect Strangers"
 "Highway Star"
 "Smoke on the Water"

Extras
 This disc includes interviews with the band

Personnel
Deep Purple
Ian Gillan – vocals, harmonica
Steve Morse – guitar
Roger Glover – bass
Ian Paice – drums
Don Airey – keyboards

with
Michael Bradford – guitar on "Hush", "Too Much Fun" and "Black Night"
Claude Nobs – harmonica on "Too Much Fun"

2007 live albums
2007 video albums
Deep Purple live albums
Deep Purple video albums
Live video albums
Albums recorded at the Montreux Jazz Festival